Stacy Bret Holmes (born May 5, 1997) is an American professional stock car racing driver. He competes full-time in the NASCAR Craftsman Truck Series, driving the No. 32 Chevrolet Silverado for Bret Holmes Racing. He won the 2020 ARCA Menards Series championship with BHR.

Racing career
Holmes began racing when he ran in go-kart events starting at age 8 and for four years in total, earning 60 wins altogether during that time. After that, he competed in racing series on both dirt and asphalt, which included winning the championship in the Crate Late Model Division. He later raced in the NASCAR Whelen All-American Series.

Holmes began racing in ARCA in 2016, intending to compete in the season opener at Daytona for Empire Racing in the No. 18 Ford, however, he withdrew for unknown reasons. He had previously driven with them in ARCA's preseason testing at the track in January.

After initially planning a part-time ARCA schedule in 2020 with Bret Holmes Racing, Holmes ran well at the beginning of the season and shifted to a full schedule. He claimed his first career win at Kansas Speedway after leading 82 laps of the 100 lap event. Holmes went on to finish the season with four top-five finishes in the final four races. He won the series championship by twelve points over Michael Self.

In 2021, Bret Holmes Racing expanded to include a part-time NASCAR Camping World Truck Series team for Holmes and Sam Mayer.

On October 1, 2022, at the Chevy Silverado 250 at Talladega, Holmes had narrowly beaten Rackley WAR driver Matt DiBenedetto to the line, but was classified as third during the caution.

Personal life
Holmes was studying building science at Auburn University in addition to racing in ARCA in 2017.

He lives in Munford, Alabama. Bret's father, Stacy Holmes, also is a former racing driver, where he often competed at the Talladega Short Track, where he held the track record until Bret himself broke it in 2013.

Motorsports career results

NASCAR
(key) (Bold – Pole position awarded by qualifying time. Italics – Pole position earned by points standings or practice time. * – Most laps led.)

Craftsman Truck Series

 Season still in progress
 Ineligible for series points

ARCA Menards Series
(key) (Bold – Pole position awarded by qualifying time. Italics – Pole position earned by points standings or practice time. * – Most laps led.)

ARCA Menards Series East

References

External links

 
 

Living people
1997 births
NASCAR drivers
ARCA Menards Series drivers
Racing drivers from Alabama
Auburn University alumni